International Association may refer to:

International Association for Cereal Science and Technology	
International Association for Computing and Philosophy
International Association for Cryptologic Research	
International Association for Cultural Freedom
International Association for Energy Economics	
International Association for Food Protection
International Association for Identification	
International Association for Plant Taxonomy
International Association for Professional Base Ball Players
International Association for Promotion of Christian Higher Education	
International Association for Technology Trade
International Association for the Advancement of Ethnology and Eugenics	
International Association for the Evaluation of Educational Achievement
International Association for the Protection of Industrial Property	
International Association for the Study of Pain	
International Association of Academies
International Association of Administrative Professionals	
International Association of Amateur Heralds	
International Association of Analytical Psychologists
International Association of Antarctic Tour Operators	
International Association of Arson Investigators	
International Association of Art Critics
International Association of Astronomical Artists	
International Association of Athletics Federations	
International Association of Bloodstain Pattern Analysts
International Association of Bridge, Structural, Ornamental and Reinforcing Iron Workers		
International Association of Chiefs of Police
International Association of Classification Societies	
International Association of Consulting Actuaries	
International Association of Crime Analysts
International Association of Dental Students	
International Association of Educators	
International Association of Emergency Managers
International Association of Exorcists	
International Association of Financial Engineers
International Association of Fire Fighters	
International Association of Gay Square Dance Clubs	
International Association of Genocide Scholars
International Association of Heat and Frost Insulators and Asbestos Workers	
International Association of Hydraulic Engineering and Research
International Association of Law Enforcement Intelligence Analysts
International Association of Lighthouse Authorities
International Association of Lions Clubs
International Association of Machinists
International Association of Machinists and Aerospace Workers
International Association of Nitrox and Technical Divers	
International Association of Privacy Professionals
International Association of Professional Numismatists	
International Association of Prosecutors	
International Association of Scientologists
International Association of Teachers of English as a Foreign Language	
International Association of Travel Agents Network
International Association of Ultrarunners	
International Association of Universities

See also